Benjamin Heller (born August 5, 1991) is an American professional baseball pitcher in the Tampa Bay Rays organization. He has previously played in Major League Baseball (MLB) for the New York Yankees from 2016 to 2017, and 2019 to 2020.

Career
Heller attended Whitewater High School in Whitewater, Wisconsin, where he holds the school record for saves, pitched two no-hitters, and had a 1.14 ERA his senior year.  Heller played college baseball at Olivet Nazarene University, and summer collegiate baseball with the Wisconsin Rapids Rafters.

Cleveland Indians
The Cleveland Indians selected Heller in the 22nd round of the 2013 Major League Baseball draft. Heller played in Cleveland's farm system from 2013 to 2016, rising to the Triple-A level.

New York Yankees
On July 31, 2016, the Indians traded Heller along with Clint Frazier, Justus Sheffield and J. P. Feyereisen to the New York Yankees for Andrew Miller. The Yankees promoted Heller to the major league roster on August 11, but he was returned to the minors without making an appearance. The Yankees promoted him again on August 23,  and he made his major league debut on August 26, 2016, pitching a scoreless eighth inning against the Baltimore Orioles. Overall with the 2016 Yankees, Heller appeared in 10 games in relief, posting a 6.43 ERA with six strikeouts in seven innings. During the 2017 season, Heller split time between the Yankees and the Triple-A Scranton/Wilkes-Barre RailRiders. He appeared in nine major league games, striking out nine batters in 11 innings with a 0.82 ERA.

On April 6, 2018, Heller underwent Tommy John surgery, and subsequently missed the rest of the season. He returned to the Yankees in 2019, appearing in 6 games, all in relief, while posting a 1.23 ERA and striking out 9 batters in  innings. Initially not included on the Yankees' postseason roster, Heller was added after CC Sabathia suffered a shoulder injury in the fourth game of the ALCS.

On September 2, 2020, Heller was ejected for the first time in his career after hitting Hunter Renfroe with a pitch.

Heller was designated for assignment on February 10, 2021, to make room on the 40-man roster for Darren O'Day. On February 12, Heller was released by the Yankees.

Arizona Diamondbacks
On February 20, 2021, Heller signed a minor league contract with the Arizona Diamondbacks organization. On April 20, 2021, Heller was released by the Diamondbacks after suffering a stress fracture in his elbow, ending his season before it began.

Minnesota Twins
On July 18, 2022, Heller signed a minor league deal with the Minnesota Twins. He made four rehab appearances for the rookie-level Florida Complex League Twins before being promoted to the Triple-A St. Paul Saints. Heller had a 21.60 ERA with three strikeouts in  innings pitched across three appearances before being released on September 5, 2022.

Tampa Bay Rays
On January 18, 2023, Heller signed a minor league contract with the Tampa Bay Rays organization.

Personal life
Ben and his wife Martha met while attending Olivet Nazarene University; she is an 8th grade math teacher. In 2017, Ben and his wife stayed together in Scranton, Pennsylvania, when Ben was pitching in the minor leagues and lived above a funeral parlor with Chad Green.

References

External links

1991 births
Living people
Baseball players from Milwaukee
Major League Baseball pitchers
New York Yankees players
Olivet Nazarene Tigers baseball players
Mahoning Valley Scrappers players
Lake County Captains players
Carolina Mudcats players
Lynchburg Hillcats players
Akron RubberDucks players
Columbus Clippers players
Tampa Tarpons players
Scranton/Wilkes-Barre RailRiders players